Higo Magalhães Batista (born 6 April 1982), sometimes known as just Higo, is a Brazilian football coach and former player who played as a defensive midfielder. He is the current head coach of Manaus.

Playing career
Born in Goiânia, Goiás, Higo began his career at Vila Nova, making his senior debut in the 2002 Série B. He left the club in 2009, and moved to Goiânia EC.

In 2011, after representing local sides Canedense, Anápolis and Aparecidense, Higo joined Boa Esporte. He left the club to sign for Villa Nova ahead of the 2012 Campeonato Mineiro, but rejoined the side on 27 April 2012.

Higo returned to his native state in 2013, joining Itumbiara. He subsequently returned to former side Aparecidense, before agreeing to a contract with Uberlândia for the 2014 campaign.

In July 2014, Higo returned to Goiânia, where he featured rarely and retired in the end of the season, aged 32.

Managerial career
After retiring, Higo worked as Ariel Mamede's assistant for several years, replacing him at the helm of Atlético Goianiense's under-20 squad in December 2018. In 2020, he returned to his first club Vila Nova, as a permanent assistant manager of the first team and manager of the under-23s.

Higo was named interim manager of the first team in March 2021, after Márcio Fernandes was sacked. He returned to his previous role after the appointment of Wagner Lopes, but was again named interim in June when Lopes left the club.

Back to the assistant role after the arrival of Hemerson Maria, Higo returned to the managerial role in August 2021, after Maria resigned. On 24 November, he renewed his contract for the 2022 season.

On 15 May 2022, Higo was sacked by Vila Nova. He was announced as head coach of Camboriú on 19 November, but was dismissed the following 6 February.

On 24 February 2023, Higo replaced Paulo Henrique Marques at the helm of Série C side Manaus.

Honours

Player
Vila Nova
Campeonato Goiano: 2005

Boa Esporte
Taça Minas Gerais: 2012

References

External links

1982 births
Living people
Sportspeople from Goiânia
Brazilian footballers
Association football midfielders
Campeonato Brasileiro Série B players
Campeonato Brasileiro Série C players
Campeonato Brasileiro Série D players
Vila Nova Futebol Clube players
Goiânia Esporte Clube players
Anápolis Futebol Clube players
Associação Atlética Aparecidense players
Boa Esporte Clube players
Villa Nova Atlético Clube players
Itumbiara Esporte Clube players
Uberlândia Esporte Clube players
Brazilian football managers
Campeonato Brasileiro Série B managers
Vila Nova Futebol Clube managers
Camboriú Futebol Clube managers
Manaus Futebol Clube managers